The Rensselaer Engineers represent Rensselaer Polytechnic Institute in ECAC women's ice hockey. The Engineers participated in the ECAC playoffs did not qualify for the NCAA tournament.

Offseason

Recruiting

Exhibition

Regular season

Standings

Schedule

Postseason
February 26: The Cornell Big Red eliminated no. 8 seed RPI by a 6–1 tally in game two of ECAC Hockey Quarterfinals.

Awards and honors
Alisa Harrison, Finalist, 2010–11 ECAC Women's Best Defensive Forward Award

Team awards
Sonja van der Bliek, Team MVP
Ashley Gaylord, Bill Cahill Memorial Award 
Laura Guillemette and Kristen Jakubowski, Robert Conway Scholar-Athlete Award 
Andie Le Donne, Most Improved Player
Jordan Smelker, Rookie of the Year 
Sydney O'Keefe, Willie Stanton Award

See also
2009–10 Rensselaer Engineers women's ice hockey season

References

R
R
RPI Engineers women's ice hockey seasons
RPI
RPI